The men's super heavyweight event was part of the boxing programme at the 1992 Summer Olympics. The weight class allowed boxers of more than 91 kilograms to compete. The competition was held from 27 July to 9 August 1992. 17 boxers from 17 nations competed.

Medalists

Results
The following boxers took part in the event:

First round
 Peter Hrivňák (TCH) – BYE
 Kevin McBride (IRL) – BYE
 Brian Nielsen (DEN) – BYE
 Jeong Seung-won (KOR) – BYE
 Roberto Balado (CUB) – BYE
 Tom Glesby (CAN) – BYE
 Larry Donald (USA) – BYE
 Nikolay Kulpin (EUN) – BYE
 Gytis Juškevičius (LTU) – BYE
 David Anyim (KEN) – BYE
 Svilen Rusinov (BUL) – BYE
 István Szikora (HUN) – BYE
 Wilhelm Fischer (GER) def. Ahmed Sarir (MAR), RSC-2 (00:56)
 Jerry Nijman (NED) def. Iraj Kia Rostami (IRN), 9:5

Second round
 Peter Hrivňák (TCH) def. Kevin McBride (IRL), 21:1
 Brian Nielsen (DEN) def. Jeong Seung-won (KOR), 16:2
 Roberto Balado (CUB) def. Tom Glesby (CAN), 16:2
 Larry Donald (USA) def. Nikolay Kulpin (EUN), RSCI-3 (00:02)
 Richard Igbineghu (NGA) def. Liade Alhassan (GHA), walk-over
 Gytis Juškevičius (LTU) def. David Anyim (KEN), RSCI-2 (01:38)
 Svilen Rusinov (BUL) def. István Szikora (HUN), 12:4
 Wilhelm Fischer (GER) def. Jerry Nijman (NED), 22:5

Quarterfinals
 Brian Nielsen (DEN) def. Peter Hrivňák (TCH), 14:4
 Roberto Balado (CUB) def. Larry Donald (USA), 10:4
 Richard Igbineghu (NGR) def. Gytis Juškevičius (LTU), KO-2 (01:27)
 Svilen Rusinov (BUL) def. Wilhelm Fischer (GER), 8:5

Semifinals
 Roberto Balado (CUB) def. Brian Nielsen (DEN), 15:1
 Richard Igbineghu (NGR) def. Svilen Rusinov (BUL), 9:7

Final
 Roberto Balado (CUB) def. Richard Igbineghu (NGR), 13:2

References

Super Heavyweight